Dacor and similar may refer to:
 Dacor (scuba diving), a former manufacturer of gear for scuba diving
 Dacor (kitchen appliances), a United States-based kitchen appliance maker
 Diplomatic and Consular Officers Retired, an organization based at the Ringgold-Carroll House, in Washington, DC, in the United States

See also
 Dacre (disambiguation)
 Dakor, a town and a municipality in Kheda district in the state of Gujarat, India
 Dacorum (disambiguation)